Daniel Joseph Baccielo (born August 26, 1991) is an American soccer player.

Career

Baccielo played college soccer at Post University between 2010 and 2013.

Baccielo signed with United Soccer League club Orange County Blues on March 29, 2016.

References

External links
 

1991 births
Living people
American soccer players
Association football forwards
AC Connecticut players
Orange County SC players
Soccer players from Connecticut
USL League Two players
USL Championship players
People from Stratford, Connecticut